The 2012 PBA D-League Aspirant's Cup is the first of the two conferences of the 2012-13 PBA Developmental League season. There are three new teams participating the league: JRU Heavy Bombers, Fruitas Shakers and Informatics Icons.

Format
The following format will be observed for the duration of the tournament:
 Single-round robin eliminations; 10 games per team; Teams are then seeded by basis on win–loss records. In case of tie, playoffs will be held only for the #2 and #6 seeds.
 The top two teams after the elimination round will automatically advance to the semifinals.
 Quarterfinals:
 QF1: #3 team vs. #6 team (#3 seed twice-to-beat)
 QF2: #4 team vs. #5 team (#4 seed twice-to-beat)
 The winners of the quarterfinals will challenge the top two teams in a best-of-three semifinals series. Matchups are:
 SF1: #1 vs. QF2
 SF2: #2 vs. QF1
The winners in the semifinals advance to the best of three Finals.

Team standings

Schedule

^ Fruitas eventually won the game, 88-82 but their win was forfeited because of fielding an ineligible player that gave the win to the Bakers.

Results

Bracket

Quarterfinals

Cagayan vs. Cebuana Lhuillier

Big Chill vs. JRU

Semifinals

NLEX-JRU series

Black Water-Cagayan series

Finals

See also
List of developmental and minor sports leagues
PBA Developmental League
Philippine Basketball Association

References

External links
Official website

PBA D-League Aspirants' Cup